Ismailovo (İsmail) is a rural locality (a village) in Kakrybashevsky Selsoviet, Tuymazinsky District, Bashkortostan, Russia. The population was 197 as of 2010. There are 28 streets.

Geography 
Ismailovo is located 12 km north of Tuymazy (the district's administrative centre) by road. Kakrybashevo is the nearest rural locality.

References 

Rural localities in Tuymazinsky District